CALinnovates is a nonpartisan technology advocacy coalition that addresses issues such as net neutrality, ride-sharing, music copyright and rate-setting.

It was founded in 2010 and is based in San Francisco, California. The organization's founder Lane Kasselman left shortly after founding the group to take a public relations job at AT&T.

References

External links 

 Montgomery, Mike Spending Quality Techy Time with Congresswoman Anna Eshoo, November 2012; ‘’The Huffingtonpost’’

Organizations based in California